Ruth Charlotte Ellis (July 23, 1899 – October 5, 2000) was an African-American woman who became widely known as the oldest surviving open lesbian, and LGBT rights activist at the age of 101, her life being celebrated in Yvonne Welbon's documentary film Living With Pride: Ruth C. Ellis @ 100.

Early life
Ellis was born in Springfield, Illinois, on July 23, 1899. She was the youngest of four children in the family and the only daughter. Her parents were born in the last years of slavery in Tennessee. Ellis' mother, Carrie Farro Ellis, died when she was a teen, while her father, Charles Ellis Sr., was the first African American mail carrier in Illinois (originally born enslaved).

Ellis came out as a lesbian around 1915 (with help from a psychology textbook), but claims to never have had to come out as her family was rather accepting. She graduated from Springfield High School in 1919, at a time when fewer than seven percent of African Americans graduated from secondary school. In the 1920s, she met the only woman she ever lived with, Ceciline "Babe" Franklin. They moved together to Detroit, Michigan, in 1937.

Career
Ellis spent her days working for a printing company in Springfield but moved elsewhere for higher pay. Encouraged by this promise, of better wages, Ellis moved to Detroit in 1937. There she watched over a young boy in Highland Park for only $7.00 a week, today that is worth about $125.62. However, she soon put the knowledge she had of the printing press, which she had picked up in Springfield, to work and secure a position with Waterfield and Heath, where she worked until opening her own press out of the West Side home she shared with Babe. Her printing business, the Ellis & Franklin Printing Co., was the first woman-owned printing shop in the state of Michigan.

Personal life
Her hobbies included dancing, bowling, painting, playing piano, and photography. Ellis and Franklin's house was also known in the African American community as the "gay spot". It was a central location for gay and lesbian parties, and also served as a refuge for African American gays and lesbians. She would continue to support those who needed books, food, or assistance with college tuition. Throughout her life, Ellis was an advocate of the rights of gays and lesbians, and of African Americans. Soon after her 70th birthday, due to her fame within the community, Ellis would become a staple at the "Michigan Womyn’s Music Festival".

On her 100th birthday, she led and was sung Happy Birthday to You by the San Francisco’s Dyke March of 1999. Although Ellis and Franklin eventually separated, they were together for more than 30 years. Franklin died in 1973 from a heart attack on her way to work.

Death
Ellis was hospitalized for two weeks with heart problems but wanted to spend her last days at home. Ellis died in her sleep in the early morning hours of October 5, 2000. Her ashes were spread in the following Womyn's festival and into the Atlantic Ocean off of Ghana.

Ruth Ellis Center

The Ruth Ellis Center honors the life and work of Ruth Ellis and is one of only four agencies in the United States dedicated to homeless LGBT youth and young adults. Among their services are a drop-in center, supportive housing programs, and an integrated Health and Wellness Center that provides medical and mental health care.

Tributes and accomplishments 
Her age did not slow her accomplishments, as her 100th birthday drew near, Ellis was being recognized in many major LGBT publications across the country, right as her documentary-like movie was coming out, "Living With Pride: Ruth Ellis @ 100." The film won several top honors at different major film festivals. In 2009, she was inducted into the Michigan Hall of Fame. In 2013, she was inducted into the Legacy Walk, an outdoor public display which celebrates LGBT history and people.

Ellis was also the oldest contributor to Piece of My Heart: A Lesbian of Colour Anthology. She was interviewed by poet and activist Terri L. Jewell about 1989/1990.

References

External links
Soul Talk Radio audio interview
Ruth Ellis @ Find a Grave
LGBTQ Nation Bio
Legacy Project Profile
Sangamon County (Illinois) Historical Society Profile

1899 births
2000 deaths
People from Springfield, Illinois
LGBT people from Illinois
LGBT people from Michigan
Activists from Illinois
Activists from Detroit
American centenarians
Lesbians
Lesbian feminists
LGBT Christians
LGBT African Americans
American LGBT rights activists
African-American centenarians
Women centenarians
Women civil rights activists
20th-century African-American women
21st-century African-American women
20th-century American LGBT people
21st-century American LGBT people
African-American activists